The 1993–94 season of the WFA National League Premier Division was the third season of national top-flight league women's football in England. The competition was organised by the Women's Football Alliance and the Football Association Committee for Women's Football.

Below the Premier Division were the Northern and Southern Divisions.

The 1993–94 women's championship was won by Doncaster Belles, their second National League trophy, after a title race with the previous champions, Arsenal.

This season coincided with the merger of the league's founding body, the Women's Football Association, into the FA in 1993. (The WFA had founded the National League in 1991.) The new organising Women's Football Alliance and FA Committee were composed of members from women's clubs, women's leagues, and FA representatives. New branding as the FA Women's Premier League began in 1994–95.

Premier Division

Final table:

See also
 1994 FA Women's Cup Final
 1993–94 WFA Women's National League Cup

References

Eng
women
FA Women's National League seasons
1